The following are the national records in athletics in Myanmar (Burma) maintained by Myanmar Track and Field Federation (MTFF).

Outdoor

Key to tables:

h = hand timing

# = not recognised by World Athletics

Men

Women

Indoor

Men

Women

References
General
World Athletics Statistic Handbook 2019: National Outdoor Records
World Athletics Statistic Handbook 2018: National Indoor Records
Specific

External links

Burmese
Records
Athletics
Athletics